The 1982 NCAA men's volleyball tournament was the 13th annual tournament to determine the national champion of NCAA men's collegiate volleyball. The tournament was played at Rec Hall in University Park, Pennsylvania during May 1982.

UCLA defeated Penn State in the final match, 3–0 (15–4, 15–9, 15–7), to win their ninth national title. The undefeated Bruins (29–0) were coached by Al Scates.

UCLA's Karch Kiraly was named the tournament's Most Outstanding Player for the second consecutive year. Kiraly, along with six other players, comprised the All-tournament team.

Qualification
Until the creation of the NCAA Men's Division III Volleyball Championship in 2012, there was only a single national championship for men's volleyball. As such, all NCAA men's volleyball programs (whether from Division I, Division II, or Division III) were eligible. A total of 4 teams were invited to contest this championship.

Tournament bracket 
Site: Rec Hall, University Park, Pennsylvania

All tournament team 
Karch Kiraly, UCLA (Most outstanding player)
Dave Saunders, UCLA
Doug Partie, UCLA
Dave Mochalski, UCLA
Steve Hunkins, Penn State
Jeff Johnson, Penn State
Bill Stetson, USC

See also 
 NCAA Men's National Collegiate Volleyball Championship
 NCAA Division I Women's Volleyball Championship (begun 1981)

References

1982
NCAA Men's Volleyball Championship
NCAA Men's Volleyball Championship
1982 in sports in Pennsylvania
May 1982 sports events in the United States
Volleyball in Pennsylvania